Victory Bateman (April 6, 1865 in Philadelphia – March 2, 1926 in Los Angeles) was an American silent film actress. Her father, Thomas Creese, and her mother, Elizabeth "Lizzie" Creese, were both actors. On stage, Ms. Bateman appeared in the 1900 tour of "The Man From Mexico" and in the 1919 tour of "Seven Days' Leave".

She was born nine days before Abraham Lincoln was assassinated but was named Victory because of the North's eventual win over the Confederate South finishing the Civil War. In the early 1890s she became embroiled in the divorce proceedings of actors Aubrey Boucicault and Amy Busby. Though later exonerated from all involvement in the case Bateman was forced to resign from an all-woman's group called The Professional Woman's League. At one time she was married to Wilfred Clarke, a son of John Sleeper Clarke and Asia Booth; and nephew of Edwin and John Wilkes Booth. They were separated for many years at the time of the Boucicault trial. She was also married, in later years, to Harry Mestayer and to George Cleveland. She and her last two husbands were eventually involved in the silent film industry.

In looks Bateman bore a sisterly resemblance to the better remembered Marie Dressler and also to the later Frances Bavier, Aunt Bee on The Andy Griffith Show.

Filmography
Nicholas Nickleby (1912) as Miss La Creevy
Her Cousin Fred (1912) as Victory, Fred's Sister
Tangled Relations (1912) as The Widow, Florence's Mother
Her Nephews from Labrador (1913) as The Aunt
The Dove in the Eagle's Nest (1913)
For Her Boy's Sake (1913)
The Lady Killer (1913)
Article 47, L' (1913)
The House in the Tree (1913)
The Hendrick's Divorce (1913)
The Ten of Spades (1914)
The Ring (1914)
The Thief and the Book (1914)
The Stronger Hand (1914)
Freckles (1914)

The Power of Evil (1916)
Romeo and Juliet (1916) as Lady Montague
The Passing of the Third Floor Back (1918) as Miss De Hooley
The Service Star (1918) as Aunt Judith
Cinderella's Twin (1920) as Ma Du Geen
Beautifully Trimmed (1920) as Mrs. Calkins
Keeping Up with Lizzie (1921) as Mrs. Henshaw
A Trip to Paradise (1921) as Mrs. Smiley
The Idle Rich (1921) as Mrs. O'Reilly
A Girl's Desire (1922) as Mrs. Browne
If I Were Queen (1922) as Aunt Ollie
Captain Fly-by-Night (1922) as Señora
Can a Woman Love Twice? (1923) as Mary's Landlady
Human Wreckage (1923) as Mother Finnegan
The Eternal Three (1923) as Mrs. Tucker
Tess of the D'Urbervilles (1924) as Joan Durbeyfield
The Turmoil (1924) as Mrs. James Sheridan

References

External links

Portrait of Bateman(Wayback)
Victory Bateman, picture gallery 1910, 1922 University of Washington, Sayre Collection
Patterson, Ada and Bateman, Victory (1902). By the Stage Door. Grafton Press. 
St. Johns, Adela Rogers (August 1921). Photoplay Magazine, p. 62. "The Woman Who Came Back." 
Victory Bateman New York Public Library (Billy Rose collection)
portrait(archived)
advert for Glycerine Tar soaps, 1900

Actresses from Philadelphia
American silent film actresses
1865 births
1926 deaths
20th-century American actresses